The 2011 Canadian Direct Insurance BC Men's Curling Championship (British Columbia's men's provincial curling championship) was held February 7–13 at the Vernon Curling Club in Vernon, British Columbia. The winning team of Jim Cotter will represent British Columbia at the 2011 Tim Hortons Brier in London, Ontario.

Teams

Standings

Results

Draw 1
February 7, 12:00 PM PT

Draw 2
February 7, 7:30 PM PT

Draw 3
February 8, 12:00 PM PT

Draw 4
February 8, 7:00 PM PT

Draw 5
February 9, 12:00 PM PT

Draw 6
February 9, 7:00 PM PT

Draw 7
February 10, 12:00 PM PT

Draw 8
February 10, 7:00 PM PT

Draw 9
February 11, 9:30 AM PT

Tie Breaker 1
February 11, 2:30 PM PT

Tie Breaker 2
February 11, 7:00 PM PT

Playoffs

1 vs. 2
February 11, 7:00 PM PT

3 vs. 4
February 12, 12:00 PM PT

Semifinal
February 12, 7:30 PM PT

Final
February 13, 3:00 PM PT

References

Canadian Direct Insurance Bc Mens Championship, 2011
Sport in Vernon, British Columbia